Jeremiah Ogbodo (born 4 July 1991), better known as Swanky Jerry, is a Nigerian celebrity fashion stylist known for his work with Tonto Dikeh, D'banj, Ice Prince, M.I, Tu Face, Juliet Ibrahim, Davido, among others.

Career
Ogbodo began his career as a celebrity fashion stylist by launching his brand, Swanky Signatures Styling, in June 2012. Aside from styling clients for red-carpet appearances and video shoots, coverage of his work has appeared in magazines and online publications. He styled Darey for House of Maliq, D'banj for a photo shoot, Praiz, and Davido for the "All of You" music video shoot, among others.

In 2014, Ogbodo won Fashion Stylist of the Year at the Lagos Fashion Awards.

References

Nigerian fashion businesspeople
Living people
1991 births